Landjäger is a semidried sausage traditionally made in Southern Germany, Austria, Switzerland, and Alsace. It is popular as a snack food during activities such as hiking. It also has a history as soldier's food because it keeps without refrigeration and comes in single-meal portions. As a meal, landjäger sausage can be boiled and served with potatoes and fresh greens.

Name
According to the Swiss German Dictionary, the name Landjäger was possibly derived from the dialect expression lang tige(n) 'smoked for a long time, air-cured for a long time.' The humorous reinterpretation in the sense of 'mounted police' may be inspired by comparing the stiffness of sausages with the perceived military rigidity of a police officer. The Alsatian and French names for smoked air-cured sausage, Gendarm and gendarme, are apparently translations of the folk-etymologized German name. "Jäger" should be remembered as a direct, simplified translation from German, meaning "hunter." This could explain the sausage's renewed popularity in the more northern and German-settled parts of the United States. Dedicated hunters consider landjägers as food for hunters taking game to carry on the traditions associated with a lifestyle from previous generations of hunters. A very similar semi-dried sausage known as salamino cacciatore (translation: "hunter's sausage") is traditionally produced in Central and Northern Italy.

Ingredients
Landjäger sausages are made of roughly equal portions of beef and pork with lard, sugar, red wine, and spices, such as caraway, black pepper, coriander seed, and garlic. They are each  in length, made into links of two. Typically, a pair of Landjäger weighs about 100 g and contains about 516 kcal. In Austria, Landjäger is sometimes made using horse meat.

See also 

 Culinary Heritage of Switzerland
 Swiss sausages and cured meats
 List of sausages
 Salame ticinese and Salsiz, other dried sausages from Switzerland

References

External links

Alsatian cuisine
German sausages
Swiss sausages
Culinary Heritage of Switzerland
Fermented sausages